Moghiran (also Romanized as Moghīrān) is a village in Shamil Rural District, Takht District, Bandar Abbas County, Hormozgan Province, Iran. At the 2006 census, its population was 509, in 108 families.

References 

Populated places in Bandar Abbas County